Abhijit Mukherjee (born 2 January 1960) is an Indian politician who served as Member of Parliament (MP) from the Jangipur Lok Sabha constituency in the Indian state of West Bengal.

Mukherjee won the 2012 Jangipur Lok Sabha constituency by-election by 2,536 votes defeating his nearest CPI(M) rival Muzaffar Hussain after a tough fight. The seat was vacated by his father President Pranab Mukherjee after he was elected as the President.

Mukherjee was re elected to Lok Sabha from Jangipur in 2014. He lost the 2019 election to TMC candidate Khalilur Rahaman.

Early years
Abhijit Mukherjee was born on 2 January 1960 in Hoogly in West Bengal. He is the son of late Pranab Mukherjee (the former President of India) and late Suvra Mukherjee. His grandfather, Kamada Kinkar Mukherjee, was active in the Indian independence movement and was a member of West Bengal Legislative Council between 1952 and 1964 as a representative of the Indian National Congress. Mukherjee graduated with a B.E. in Mechanical Engineering from the Jadavpur University in 1984.

Professional career
Mukherjee has worked as a corporate executive for firms like the Bharat Heavy Electricals Limited, Maruti Udyog Limited and the Steel Authority of India Limited. He was General Manager in charge of Corporate Social Responsibility [CSR] in the Steel Authority of India Limited.

Political career
Mukherjee began his political career as a state legislator in West Bengal. Following his father's election to the presidency, he contested the by-election for the Jangipur Seat in the Lok Sabha and won. He was re-elected in the 2014 Indian general election in a four cornered contest and retained his seat in Jangipur Constituency of Dist : Murshidabad, West Bengal. He is one of the four Members of Parliament in the Lok Sabha from West Bengal who are members of the Indian National Congress. In the 2019 General elections to the Lok Sabha, he lost to his rival candidate from TMC.

On 5 July 2021, he joined All India Trinamool Congress after resigning from Indian National Congress.

References

External links
Mukherjee's website

1960 births
Indian National Congress politicians from West Bengal
Living people
Politicians from Kolkata
Jadavpur University alumni
India MPs 2009–2014
Children of presidents of India
Lok Sabha members from West Bengal
People from Birbhum district
India MPs 2014–2019
People from Hooghly district
West Bengal politicians
People from Murshidabad district